One Metropolitan Square, also known as Met Square, is an office skyscraper completed in 1989, located in downtown St. Louis, Missouri. At , it is the tallest building in the city, and second tallest building in Missouri behind the One Kansas City Place in Kansas City by only 31 feet.

Major tenants include architecture firm Hellmuth, Obata and Kassabaum, which also designed the building, the Bryan Cave law firm, the Evans & Dixon law firm, the Brown & Crouppen law firm, and the Better Business Bureau.

The building was constructed by McCarthy Building Companies, Inc., the largest general contractor in St. Louis. In early May, 2014, a DJI Phantom quadcopter drone crashed into the building.

See also
List of tallest buildings in Missouri
List of tallest buildings in St. Louis

References

External links
Official website

Skyscraper office buildings in St. Louis
Office buildings completed in 1989
HOK (firm) buildings
Downtown St. Louis
1989 establishments in Missouri
Buildings and structures in St. Louis
Skyscrapers in St. Louis